Steven Dale Schafersman (born November 4, 1948) is an American geologist and current president of Texas Citizens for Science, an advocacy group that opposes teaching creationism as science in the public schools. He is also known for his blog BadGeology.com.

Biography
Schafersman holds a B.S. in Geology and Biology from Northern Illinois University, a M.S. in Geology, and a Ph.D. in Geology (1983) from Rice University. He currently resides in Midland, Texas with his wife Dr. Gae Kovalick, at the University of Texas of the Permian Basin professor of Biology. He specialized in invertebrate paleontology, stratigraphy, and sedimentary petrology.

Schafersman grew up collecting fossils, mushrooms, insects, rocks, minerals, and playing outdoors in Texas, Arkansas, and Illinois.

Schafersman  taught at the University of Texas of the Permian Basin (2000-2002), Miami University (Ohio) (1994-1999), University of Houston (1984-1989) and  Houston Community College (1974-1978 and 1984-1994).

He has been a pro-science activist since 1989.

In addition, he created the Free Inquiry (defunct) website, dedicated to educating the public on humanism and skepticism and the Texas Citizens for Science website, committed to opposing the representation of religious concepts such as intelligent design and creationism as science in Texas textbooks. Schafersman contributes to a blog column for the Houston Chronicle at Evo.Sphere Blog.

Texas State Board of Education
Schafersman works against the movement to revise the Texas State Board of Education science curriculum to include religious objections to evolution.

References

External links
 Texas Citizens for Science website
 Schafersman's blog for the Houston Chronicle

1948 births
Living people
20th-century American geologists
American paleontologists
Critics of creationism
Rice University alumni
Northern Illinois University alumni
University of Texas Permian Basin faculty
People from Dumas, Texas
21st-century American geologists
Scientists from Texas
Miami University faculty
University of Houston faculty